John Clarence Taylor, (March 2, 1890 – March 25, 1983) was elected to the U.S. House of Representatives for South Carolina's 3rd congressional district. He served for three terms from 1933 to 1939.

Biography

John Clarence was born in Honea Path, Anderson County, South Carolina, on March 2, 1890. He attended the Fruitland Institute, Hendersonville, North Carolina. He was graduated from the law department of the University of South Carolina in Columbia in 1919. During the First World War, he attended the Officers’ Training School at Camp Johnston in Florida and was discharged into the Reserves at the end of the war. He was admitted to the bar in 1919. He was the clerk of court and register of deeds for Anderson County, South Carolina, from 1920 until elected to Congress. He was elected as a Democrat to the Seventy-third, Seventy-fourth, and Seventy-fifth Congresses (March 4, 1933 – January 3, 1939). He was an unsuccessful candidate for renomination in 1938 to the Seventy-sixth Congress. He resumed his former business pursuits. He served in the South Carolina Senate from 1951 to 1954 and 1959 to 1962. He died in Anderson, South Carolina, on March 25, 1983, and was interred in Garden of Memories, Honea Path, South Carolina.

External links
 Congressional biography

1890 births
1983 deaths
Democratic Party members of the United States House of Representatives from South Carolina
Democratic Party South Carolina state senators
20th-century American politicians
People from Honea Path, South Carolina